Jefferson Anilson Silva Encada (born 17 April 1998) is a Bissau-Guinean professional footballer who plays for Egyptian club Pharco as a forward.

Club career
On 28 October 2018, Encada made his professional debut with Vitória Guimarães B in a 2018–19 LigaPro match against 
Paços Ferreira.

He made his Primeira Liga debut for Vitória Guimarães on 8 September 2019 in a game against Rio Ave.

International career
He made his debut for Guinea-Bissau national football team on 26 March 2021 in an AFCON 2021 qualifier against Eswatini.

References

External links

1998 births
Living people
Bissau-Guinean footballers
Guinea-Bissau international footballers
Association football forwards
S.C. Olhanense players
Vitória S.C. B players
Vitória S.C. players
Leixões S.C. players
Pharco FC players
Primeira Liga players
Liga Portugal 2 players
Campeonato de Portugal (league) players
Egyptian Premier League players
2021 Africa Cup of Nations players
Bissau-Guinean expatriate footballers
Expatriate footballers in Portugal
Bissau-Guinean expatriate sportspeople in Portugal
Expatriate footballers in Egypt
Bissau-Guinean expatriate sportspeople in Egypt